Henry A. Clark (August 3, 1818 in Sidney, Delaware County, New York – December 11, 1906) was an American lawyer and politician from New York.

Life
He graduated from Hamilton College in 1838. Then he studied law in Buffalo, was admitted to the bar in 1841, and practiced in Bainbridge, Chenango County.

He was a member of the New York State Senate (23rd D.) in 1862 and 1863.

On February 15, 1865, he married Ellen A. Curtiss, and they had three children.

He was buried at Saint Peter's Cemetery in Bainbridge.

Sources
 The New York Civil List compiled by Franklin Benjamin Hough, Stephen C. Hutchins and Edgar Albert Werner (1870; pg. 443)
 Biographical Sketches of the State Officers and the Members of the Legislature of the State of New York in 1862 and '63 by William D. Murphy (1863; pg. 51ff)

External links

1818 births
1906 deaths
Republican Party New York (state) state senators
People from Sidney, New York
Hamilton College (New York) alumni
19th-century American politicians